Harry Richman (born Henry Reichman Jr.; August 10, 1895 – November 3, 1972) was an American singer, actor, dancer, comedian, pianist, songwriter, bandleader, and nightclub performer, at his most popular in the 1920s and 1930s. In his peak years, he was one of the highest‐paid performers in show business.

Early life 
Richman was born in Cincinnati, Ohio, to Russian Jewish parents Henry and Katie (née Golder) Reichman. His father died when Richman was 14 years old.

Career
Richman began playing piano in a Cincinnati saloon at age 10. At 18, he changed his name to "Harry Richman", by which time he was already a professional entertainer in vaudeville. He claimed to be making $25,000 a week in 1931 ($415,000 in 2018 dollars) He also owned a popular night club – a Speakeasy, "Club Richman", which was located next to Carnegie Hall. The room was large, seating 240 people. It was designed to look like a patio with fake windows that opened out to scenes painted in the windows. The roof was painted with stars to reflect the spotlight on the performers. It was a popular location till it burned down in 1929.

Eventually known for his nasal baritone, he started out and worked as a piano accompanist to such stars as Mae West and Nora Bayes. With Bayes' act, he made his Broadway debut in 1922. He appeared in several editions of the George White's Scandals in the 1920s to acclaim. Becoming a name, he appeared in "Scandals" as master of ceremonies in 1926; where on opening night the first seven rows of the orchestra commanded $50 a seat ($700 in 2018 dollars). He appeared in the 1931 Ziegfeld Follies.

He made his feature movie debut in Hollywood in 1930 with the film Puttin' On the Ritz, featuring the Irving Berlin song of the same title, which gave Richman a phonograph record hit that year. His film career was short-lived due to his somewhat overpowering personality, and his limited acting skills. This made little difference to his career as he remained a popular nightclub host and stage performer.

Leonard Maltin is widely quoted as having written of Puttin' On the Ritz: "A songwriter drinks and goes blind – after seeing this you'll want to do the same". In fact, the actual quote is "Famed nightclub entertainer Richman made his film debut in this primitive early talkie about vaudevillian who can't handle success and turns to drink. You may do the same after watching Richman's performance – though he does introduce the title song by Irving Berlin."

Richman largely retired in the 1940s, although he made sporadic appearances, including on television, into the 1950s. In 1966, Richman released his memoirs, A Hell of a Life.

Personal life

Marriages
Richman was married three times and had no children. His first marriage was to Melvina Stephenson, whom he married in 1917. After divorcing Stephenson, Richard married showgirl Hazel Forbes in March 1938, in Palm Springs, California. He and Forbes shared a sumptuous home in Beechhurst, Long Island before divorcing in 1942. Richman married for the third and final time in 1943 to Yvonne Day. That marriage also ended in divorce.

Political views
Richman was a Democrat, he sang "God Bless America" at the 1940 Democratic National Convention, held at Chicago.

Hobbies and adventures
He enjoyed sailing; however, his yacht Chevalier II exploded in July 1931, killing one.

Richman was also an amateur aviator of some accomplishment, being the co-pilot in 1936, with famed flyer Henry Tindall "Dick" Merrill, of the first round-trip transatlantic flight in his own single-engine Vultee V-1AD transport, named "The Lady Peace." Richman had filled much of the empty space of the aircraft with ping pong balls as a flotation aid in case they were forced down in the Atlantic. They were forced to land in Wales in 18 hours and 38 minutes.  The publicity enabled him to sell autographed ping pong balls until his death, and specimens of these continue to show up for sale on celebrity memorabilia websites. The only surviving Vultee V-1, of which only 25 were built, similar to Richman's, is in the Shannon Air Museum in Fredericksburg, Va.

Later years and death
Richman spent most of his fortune lavishly, and his final years were mostly impoverished. He suffered from a long string of illnesses over several years before his death. On November 3, 1972, Richman died in Hollywood, California, at the age of 77. He is buried at Hillside Memorial Park Cemetery in Culver City, California.

References

Further reading
 Oderman, Stuart, Talking to the Piano Player 2. BearManor Media, 2009. .
 Richman, Harry, A Hell of a Life, New York, 1966

External links

 
 
 Harry Richman recordings at the Discography of American Historical Recordings.

1895 births
1972 deaths
20th-century American male actors
20th-century American conductors (music)
20th-century American male singers
20th-century American singers
American bandleaders
Aviators from Ohio
Jewish American male actors
Jewish American comedians
Jewish singers
Vaudeville performers
Vocalion Records artists
Burials at Hillside Memorial Park Cemetery
Jewish American male comedians
20th-century American Jews